The Brooke Owens Fellowship is a non-profit program in the United States that provides paid internships and executive mentorship for undergraduate women seeking a career in aviation or space exploration. The fellowship was created to honor the memory of Brooke Owens, a pilot and space policy expert who died of cancer at the age of 36.

Motivation and overview 
The program looks to improve diversity within the aerospace industry. The program offers students paid summer internships at companies (including SpaceX, Avascent, Commercial Spaceflight Federation, Orbital ATK, Virgin Orbit, and Blue Origin), travel stipends and assigned mentors. It was created by Lori Garver, a former NASA deputy administrator, along with aerospace executives William Pomerantz (Virgin Orbit) and Cassie Kloberdanz Lee (Vulcan Inc.).

Fellows received two experienced aerospace mentors, one at their host industry, and another in an associated sector. Mentors include Lori Garver, Diana Trujillo, Charles Bolden, Pamela Melroy, Dava Newman, Danielle Wood, Emily Calandrelli, Will Pomerantz and Cassie Lee. The fellows are connected to a Fellowship class and an alumni network. The program is run with Future Space Leaders, and emphasises creativity. The annual Brooke Owens Fellowship conference happens during the Future Space Conference in Washington, D.C. Whilst the program is open to international students, some institutions can only host US citizens or green card holders.

The program's success has resulted in the creation of several spin-off fellowships, including the Patti Grace Smith Fellowship, Zed Factor Fellowship, and Zenith Canada Pathways Fellowship.

References

External links 
Brooke Owens Fellowship

Fellowships
Science policy
Scholarships in the United States
Space industry
Internship programs
Charities based in Washington, D.C.
Organizations established in 2017
2017 establishments in Washington, D.C.